Jonathan Michael Madsen (born February 12, 1980) is a retired American mixed martial artist who most recently competed in the Heavyweight division of Titan FC. A professional competitor since 2008, Madsen has also formerly competed for the UFC and was a cast member of Spike TV's The Ultimate Fighter: Heavyweights fighting for Team Rashad.

Background
Born in Orange County, California and raised in Doland, South Dakota, Madsen attended Doland High School where he was a decorated high school and college wrestler. Madsen has won many awards and even had a high school wrestling match with former UFC heavyweight champion Brock Lesnar. Besides wrestling, Madsen was a track and football star. Madsen enrolled in South Dakota State University and won an NCAA Division II national title in wrestling his freshman year.

Mixed martial arts career

Early career
After college he still had the passion to compete and decided to pursue mixed martial arts full-time. Wanting to train with one of the best mixed martial arts gyms, Madsen packed his stuff and moved out of his home in South Dakota to train with The H.I.T. Squad (Hughes Intensive Training) in Granite City, Illinois. Madsen decided to skip competing as an amateur and went straight to professional, with a previous record of 3–0 Madsen was picked to compete on The Ultimate Fighter 10.

The Ultimate Fighter
Madsen was on the tenth season  of The Ultimate Fighter. In the first episode, Madsen advanced to the quarterfinals after he defeated Team Rampage's second pick Abe Wagner via unanimous decision.

In the quarterfinals, Madsen fought teammate Brendan Schaub and was knocked out in the second round via two straight right punches.

Ultimate Fighting Championship
Madsen made his official UFC debut at the Ultimate Fighter 10 Finale. He fought castmate and teammate Justin Wren to a decision of 30–27, 28–29 and 29–28 winning by split decision.

Madsen next fought Mostapha Al-turk at UFC 112 in Abu Dhabi. After 3 rounds, Madsen was declared the winner via unanimous decision (29-28, 29-28, 29-28).

At UFC 116, Madsen defeated Karlos Vemola via unanimous decision.

Madsen was expected to face Todd Duffee on October 23, 2010 at UFC 121.  However, Duffee was forced off the card with an injury and replaced by Gilbert Yvel. Both men circled early on in the fight before Madsen gained a double leg takedown. Madsen then hit Yvel multiple times forcing the referee to stop the fight.

Madsen next faced his DeathClutch teammate Mike Russow at UFC Fight Night 24.  He lost the fight via doctor stoppage at the end of round two in the first loss of his professional career. Despite compiling a 4-1 UFC record, Madsen was subsequently released from the UFC after the loss.

Post-UFC career
Madsen faced Matt Foster at PCFN 7 on March 8, 2014. He won by KO in the first round.

Titan Fighting Championship
Madsen was expected to face Dave Herman for the vacant Titan FC heavyweight championship at Titan FC 32 on November 20, 2014. On November 4, 2014 it was announced that Titan FC 32 would be postponed to December 19, 2014 and will be moved from Augusta, Georgia to Lowell, Massachusetts Subsequent to the show's move, Herman pulled out of the bout and was replaced by Jack May. The bout was ultimately pulled from this show with no reason given.

On March 20, 2015, he faced Chase Gormley for the inaugural Titan FC Heavyweight Championship at Titan FC 33. He lost the fight via unanimous decision.

Mixed martial arts record

|-
| Loss
| align=center| 8–2
| Chase Gormley
| Decision (unanimous)
| Titan FC 33
| 
| align=center| 5
| align=center| 5:00
| Mobile, Alabama, United States
| 
|-
| Win
|align=center| 8–1
|Matt Foster
| KO (punch)
| PCFN 7
| 
|align=center| 1
|align=center| 0:48
|Redfield, South Dakota, United States
|
|-
| Loss
|align=center| 7–1
|Mike Russow
| TKO (doctor stoppage)
| UFC Fight Night: Nogueira vs. Davis
| 
|align=center| 2
|align=center| 5:00
|Seattle, Washington, United States
| 
|-
| Win
|align=center| 7–0
|Gilbert Yvel
| TKO (punches)
| UFC 121
| 
|align=center| 1
|align=center| 1:48
|Anaheim, California, United States
| 
|-
| Win
|align=center| 6–0
|Karlos Vémola
| Decision (unanimous)
| UFC 116
| 
|align=center| 3
|align=center| 5:00
|Las Vegas, Nevada, United States
| 
|-
| Win
|align=center| 5–0
|Mostapha al-Turk
| Decision (unanimous)
| UFC 112
| 
|align=center| 3
|align=center| 5:00
|Abu Dhabi, United Arab Emirates
| 
|-
| Win
|align=center| 4–0
|Justin Wren
| Decision (split)
| The Ultimate Fighter: Heavyweights Finale
| 
|align=center| 3
|align=center| 5:00
|Las Vegas, Nevada, United States
| 
|-
| Win
|align=center| 3–0
|Ryan Kotzea
| Decision (unanimous)
| The Cage Inc.: Shock Wave
| 
|align=center| 5
|align=center| 5:00
|Sioux Falls, South Dakota, United States
| 
|-
| Win
|align=center| 2–0
|Waylon Goldsmith
| TKO (punches)
| The Cage Inc.: Summer Slam 4
| 
|align=center| 1
|align=center| 1:02
|Sioux Falls, South Dakota, United States
| 
|-
| Win
|align=center| 1–0
|Cody Griffin
| KO (punches)
| Crossroads Combat Challenge 3
| 
|align=center| 1
|align=center| 1:53
|Effingham, Illinois, United States
|

Mixed martial arts exhibition record

See also
 List of current UFC fighters
 List of male mixed martial artists

References

External links
 
 
 Jon Madsen profile at the National Wrestling Hall of Fame

American male mixed martial artists
Mixed martial artists from South Dakota
Heavyweight mixed martial artists
Mixed martial artists utilizing collegiate wrestling
Living people
1980 births
American male sport wrestlers
Sportspeople from Orange County, California
Mixed martial artists from California
People from Doland, South Dakota
South Dakota State University alumni
Ultimate Fighting Championship male fighters